Paw Karl Lagermann (born 30 July 1977 in Vanløse) is a Danish singer, songwriter and record producer.

Paw Lagermann has been a member of the Danish pop duo Infernal since 1997. He also has recordings under the name Paw & Lina with fellow Infernal member Lina Rafn.

Discography
As part of Infernal
Refer to detailed Infernal discography
As Paw & Lina

References

External links
 Infernal's official website
 Paw Lagermann Unofficial website
 Unofficial Infernal Fans Forum

Danish composers
Male composers
1977 births
Nightclub owners
Living people
Danish record producers